Manohar Lal Panth, also known as Mannu Kori, is politician in the Indian state of Uttar Pradesh. He was elected to the state's legislative assembly  from the Mehroni assembly constituency in 2017, and was reelected in 2022. He was selected as the state minister of labour and employment exchanges by Chief Minister Yogi Adityanath in March, 2017.

See also
 Yogi Adityanath ministry (2017–)

References

Uttar Pradesh MLAs 2017–2022
Bharatiya Janata Party politicians from Uttar Pradesh
Living people
Yogi ministry
Uttar Pradesh MLAs 2022–2027
People from Lalitpur district, India
1954 births